Allah Dad may refer to:
 Allah Dad, East Azerbaijan
 Allah Dad, Sistan and Baluchestan
 Allah Dad, Chabahar, Sistan and Baluchestan Province